Magnus Ngei Abe (born 24 May 1965) is a Nigerian politician who served as a Senator for the Rivers South East Senatorial District of Rivers State, Nigeria. He was first elected to the Nigerian Senate in 2011 in the April 2011 Federal elections and again in a rerun poll in December 2016. In the 2015 general elections, he had lost a return bid to Senator Olaka Nwogu. Before the poll, like others in Rivers, was invalidated by the court, necessitating a rerun poll.
In 2019, Abe was succeeded by Hon. Barry Mpigi.

Early life and education
Magnus Ngei Abe was born on 24 May 1965 in Nchia, Eleme, Rivers State.
He attended St. Patrick College, Ikot-Ansa, Calabar and Akpor Grammar School, Ozuoba.

Law career
After obtaining an LL.B degree in Law, he was called to Nigerian Bar in 1987, starting work as a Pupil State Counsel for the Federal Ministry of Justice, Lagos. 
He went into private practice as a junior partner with Okocha & Okocha, Manuchim Chambers, later becoming a managing partner with Etim-Inyang, Abe in Port Harcourt.

Political career
Abe entered politics in 1999 when he was elected into the Rivers State House of Assembly, serving as a Minority Leader. 
In 2003 he defected to the PDP, and from 2003 to 2007 he was Commissioner of Information in Rivers State in the administration of Governor Peter Odili.
When Governor Chibuike Amaechi entered office in May 2007, Abe was appointed as Secretary to the State Government. 
He resigned to compete for the position of Senator for Rivers South East, but was then re-appointed as the Secretary to Rivers State Government.

In the April 2011 elections, Abe gained 154,218 votes, ahead of Dr. Nomate Toate Kpea of the Action Congress of Nigeria (ACN) with 34,978 votes.
Senator Magnus Abe defected to All Progressives Congress (APC) on  29 January 2014.

References

1965 births
Living people
Members of the Senate (Nigeria) from Rivers State
Rivers State Peoples Democratic Party politicians
Members of the Rivers State House of Assembly
Peoples Democratic Party members of the Senate (Nigeria)
Secretaries to the State Government (Rivers State)
All Progressives Congress politicians
People from Eleme (local government area)